General elections were held in the Dominican Republic in 1914. Juan Isidro Jimenes Pereyra was elected president, defeating Horacio Vásquez and Luis Felipe Vidal.

Results

President
The president was elected in a two-stage process, with voters electing an electoral college, which then elected the president. Different publications give different figures for the public vote; the El Radical newspaper published final results on 1 December 1914 with Vásquez' Red Party and the pro-government Partido Legalista of Luis Felipe Vidal receiving 37,858 votes and the Jimenes–Velásquez alliance receiving 36,405; in 1940 Sumner Welles published volume II of Naboth's Vineyard: The Dominican Republic, 1844–1924 stating Jimenes had received 40,076 votes, while Vásquez and Vidal received a combined total of 39,632.

Senate

Chamber of Deputies

References

Dominican
1914 in the Dominican Republic
Presidential elections in the Dominican Republic
Elections in the Dominican Republic